James Clifford Hansen (December 29, 1893 – July 18, 1967) was mayor of Murray, Utah for two stints in office.  He served as mayor during 1944-1945 and again from 1948-1957. Previous to being elected mayor, Hansen served a total of 12 years as a Murray city commissioner. During his time in office, he was known for greatly expanding electric power generation for the municipally-owned utility and improving infrastructure for the city's water department.

A veteran of overseas service during World War I, Hansen is a member of the American Legion and the Veterans of Foreign Wars. He was a director of the Cahoon Maxfield Irrigation Co and served on the Salt Lake County fair board having been one of the originators of the fair.

In 1943, he defeated incumbent mayor, Curtis Shaw, but was in turn defeated in his re-election bid in 1945 by William Ernest Smith. He ran for Salt Lake County commissioner, but was defeated in 1946. He would succeed in ousting Smith, and be re-elected mayor for two more terms. He is the only mayor of Murray to have two non-consecutive terms. He was the first Murray mayor to serve a four-year term under a state law mandating a change from 2 to 4 year terms.

References 

1893 births
1967 deaths
Utah city council members
American military personnel of World War I
Mayors of Murray, Utah
20th-century American politicians